James Douglas LeMoine (born April 29, 1945) is a former American football offensive guard who played three seasons, for the Buffalo Bills and Houston Oilers. He played tight end in college and went to Utah State.

References

1945 births
Buffalo Bills players
Houston Oilers players
Living people
Players of American football from California
Sportspeople from Alameda, California
Utah State Aggies football players
American football tight ends